The following article outlines the statistics for the 2011 FIFA Women's World Cup, which took place in Germany from 26 June to 17 July.

Goals scored from penalty shoot-outs are not counted, and matches decided by penalty shoot-outs are counted as draws.

Goalscorers

Assists

Scoring

Overall
Overall

Timing
 First goal of the tournament: Marie-Laure Delie for France against Nigeria
 First brace of the tournament: Marta for Brazil against Norway
 Only hat-trick of the tournament: Homare Sawa for Japan against Mexico
 Last goal of the tournament: Homare Sawa for Japan against United States
 Last brace of the tournament: Nahomi Kawasumi for Japan against Sweden
 Fastest goal in a match from kickoff: 2nd minute
Stephany Mayor for Mexico against New Zealand
Latest goal in a match without extra time: 90+4th minute
Hannah Wilkinson for New Zealand against Mexico
 Latest goal in a match with extra time: 120+2 minutesAbby Wambach for United States against Brazil

Teams

Most goals scored by one player in a match: 3
Homare Sawa for Japan against Mexico

Wins and losses
 Most wins: 5 – Sweden
 Fewest wins: 0 – Canada, Colombia, Equatorial Guinea, Mexico, New Zealand, North Korea
 Most losses: 3 – Canada, Equatorial Guinea, France
 Fewest losses: 0 – Brazil, England
 Most draws: 2 – England, Mexico, United States

Match awards

Player of the Match

Clean sheets

Squads

Multiple World Cups
Scoring at three or more World Cups

Appearing at four or more World Cups

Overall results
Bold numbers indicate the maximum values in each column.

By team

By confederation

References

statistics